Makee Township is one of eighteen townships in Allamakee County, Iowa, USA.  At the 2010 census, its population was 4,176.

History
Makee Township was organized in 1852.

Geography
According to the USGS, it contains five cemeteries: County Care Facility, Lycurgus, Makee Township, Oakland and Round Prairie.

References

External links
 US-Counties.com
 City-Data.com

Townships in Allamakee County, Iowa
Townships in Iowa
1852 establishments in Iowa
Populated places established in 1852